Coláiste Moibhí was a preparatory school in Ireland providing Irish-language instruction for Protestant boys and girls intending to proceed to train as primary schoolteachers.  Operating from 1926 to 1995, it was located just outside Shankill, County Dublin, until the premises closed.  It was relocated in Rathmines, Dublin.  Run by the Church of Ireland, it became in 1968 the Juniorate of the adjacent Church of Ireland College of Education, to which most pupils would graduate.  It was named after Moibhí, a sixth-century saint from Kilmovee, County Mayo.

The college was one of six Irish-language preparatory schools established by the government of the newly established Irish Free State, as part of a Gaelicisation policy which required a supply of teachers fluent in Irish. It was approved by John Allen Fitzgerald Gregg, the Church of Ireland Archbishop of Dublin. It survived the closure of the other 5 (Catholic ethos) preparatory schools (2 for boys and 3 for girls) in 1961, as decided by Patrick_Hillery, Minister for Education in the Fianna Fáil Government between 1959-1965, and later President of Ireland.  In light of the growth of multidenominational schools, Coláiste Moibhí closed in June 1995 and its former premises now form the Resource Centre of the Church of Ireland Training College library.

References
 
 
  http://www.education.ie/en/Publications/Statistics/Statistical-Report-1942-1943.pdf

1926 establishments in Ireland
Educational institutions established in 1926
Education in Dublin (city)
Anglican schools in the Republic of Ireland
Secondary schools in Dublin (city)
Irish-language schools and college
Rathmines
Defunct Christian schools
1995 disestablishments in Ireland
Educational institutions disestablished in 1995